Martin Damsbo (born 26 May 1985 in Odense), is a Danish athlete who competes in compound archery. He has won medals at the World Archery Championships, a gold medal at the 2013 Archery World Cup Final, and achieved his highest world ranking of 2 in 2010.

References

External links

 

1985 births
Living people
Danish male archers
World Archery Championships medalists
Sportspeople from Odense
21st-century Danish people